Amblyolepis is a genus of flowering plants in the daisy family described as a genus in 1836.

There is only one known species, Amblyolepis setigera, the Huisache daisy, native to Texas and northeastern Mexico (Tamaulipas, Nuevo León, Coahuila).

References

Helenieae
Flora of Northeastern Mexico
Taxa named by Augustin Pyramus de Candolle
Monotypic Asteraceae genera